The 2013–14 Ole Miss Rebels women's basketball team represented University of Mississippi during the 2013–14 NCAA Division I women's basketball season. The Rebels, who were led by first-year head coach Matt Insell, played their home games at Tad Smith Coliseum and are a members of the Southeastern Conference.

Roster

Schedule

|-
!colspan=9| Exhibition

|-
!colspan=9| Regular Season

|-
!colspan=9| 2014 SEC women's basketball tournament

Source

See also
2013–14 Ole Miss Rebels men's basketball team

References

Ole Miss Rebels women's basketball seasons
Ole Miss
Ole Miss Rebels
Ole Miss Rebels